Pimpinone, TWV 21:15, is a comic opera by the German composer Georg Philipp Telemann with a libretto by Johann Philipp Praetorius. Its full title is Die Ungleiche Heirat zwischen Vespetta und Pimpinone oder Das herrsch-süchtige Camer Mägden (The Unequal Marriage Between Vespetta and Pimpinone or The Domineering Chambermaid). The work is described as a Lustiges Zwischenspiel ("comic intermezzo") in three parts. It was first performed at the Oper am Gänsemarkt in Hamburg on 27 September 1725 as light relief between the acts of Telemann's adaptation of Handel's opera seria Tamerlano. Pimpinone was highly successful and pointed the way forward to later intermezzi, particularly Giovanni Battista Pergolesi's La serva padrona. 


Roles

Plot
Vespetta the chambermaid wheedles her way into marrying her employer, old Pimpinone. Once married she shows her waspish nature (the name Vespetta means "little wasp") and completely dominates her husband.

Recordings
Pimpinone, Mechthild Bach, Michael Schopper, La Stagione, conducted by Michael Schneider (Deutsche Harmonia Mundi, 1993)
Pimpinone oder Die ungleiche Heirat, Erna Roscher, Reiner Süß, Staatskapelle Berlin, conducted by Helmut Koch (Berlin Classics)
Pimpinone, Yvonne Ciannella, Erich Wenk, Bach-Collegium Stuttgart, conducted by Helmuth Rilling (Turnabout TV 34124S  stereo, 1967)

Sources
The Viking Opera Guide ed. Amanda Holden (Viking, 1993)
Magazine de l'opéra baroque 

Operas
Operas by Georg Philipp Telemann
German-language operas
1725 operas
Intermezzi
Opera world premieres at the Hamburg State Opera